The United States women's national soccer team (sometimes referred to as USWNT) represents the United States in international soccer competition and is controlled by U.S. Soccer. The U.S. team won the first ever Women's World Cup in 1991, and has since been a superpower in women's soccer.

In 2011, the team won the Four Nation Tournament (7th title through 2011), the Algarve Cup (8th title through 2011) and were runners-up at the 2011 FIFA Women's World Cup, finishing with a 14-4-2 record. They were coached by Pia Sundhage.

2011 schedule
The following is a list of matches that were played in 2011.

Four Nations Tournament

Algarve Cup

International friendlies

World Cup

International friendlies

References
U.S. Soccer

2011